Aung Moe (born 9 June 1985) is a footballer from Burma, and a midfielder for the Myanmar national football team.

He currently plays for Chin United in Myanmar National League.

References

1988 births
Living people
Burmese footballers
Myanmar international footballers
Yangon United F.C. players
Association football midfielders
Southern Myanmar F.C. players